The  is a railway company in Shizuoka Prefecture, Japan, which first opened in 1927. The company belonged to the Meitetsu Group until 2015, when it was sold to Eclipse Hidaka, a food and hotel company headquartered in Hidaka, Hokkaido.

Operation
The company operates preserved steam locomotives, and has "sister railway" agreements with Brienz Rothorn Bahn in Switzerland and Alishan Forest Railway in Taiwan. Because of its historical rolling stock and the picturesque scenery, the Ōigawa Main Line is often used for shooting films or TV programs, especially those set in the pre-war period.

Lines
The company operates two  gauge railway lines. The Ōigawa Main Line from Kanaya to Senzu; and the Ikawa Line from Senzu to Ikawa. Both lines function primarily as sightseeing lines. The former is known for its heritage steam trains, while the latter is the only rack railway line in existence in Japan.

The company also operates a bus line in Sumatakyō Onsen, Kawanehon.

Stations
 Stations of Ōigawa Railway

See also

List of railway companies in Japan

External links 

  

Meitetsu Group
Companies based in Shizuoka Prefecture
Heritage railways in Japan